Ioanna Haralabidis (in ;  born May 19, 1995) is a Greek-born American water polo player.

College career
Haralabidis attended University of Southern California, playing on the women's water polo team from 2014 to 2017. She won NCAA championships in 2016.

International career
Haralabidis has competed on both the junior and senior national teams for Greece. Won a gold medal at 2011 European Junior Championship in Madrid, Spain. Won another gold at 2012 Youth World Championships in Perth, Australia. Won a gold at 2014 European U19 Championship in Ostia, Italy. She also won a bronze medal with the senior team at 2012 FINA World League in Changshu, China.

Club career 
Ioanna plays for the 2021-22 season for Ethnikos, a club with longstanding tradition in Greek and European water polo. Along with her sister Stephania, she helped her team win the 2021-22 LEN Trophy.

Personal life

Haralabidis has two sisters, her twin Stephania and older sister Anastasia.

References

External links
 

American female water polo players
Canadian people of Greek descent
Greek female water polo players
Living people
1995 births
Greek twins
Twin sportspeople
Water polo players from Athens
21st-century American women
Ethnikos Piraeus Water Polo Club players